Members of the European Parliament (MEPs) are elected by the population of the member states of the European Union (EU).  The European Electoral Act 2002 allows member states the choice to allocate electoral subdivisions or constituencies for the European Parliament elections in several different ways.

Most EU countries operate a single national constituency which elects MEPs for the whole country. Belgium and Ireland are each subdivided into constituencies, with electoral results calculated separately in each constituency. Germany, Italy and Poland are each subdivided into electoral districts, with the number of representatives determined at the national level after each election in proportion to the votes cast in each district.

In Germany, political parties are entitled to present lists of candidates either at Länder or national level.

France was subdivided into 8 constituencies from 2004 until 2019. Denmark had a separate constituency for Greenland until 1985, when the autonomous territory withdrew from the EEC (later expanded to become the EU).

Currently, all constituencies use various forms of proportional representation (PR), except the single-seat German-speaking electoral college in Belgium, which uses first-past-the-post. The parliament as a whole is not PR, because seats are apportioned between member states by degressive proportionality.



List of constituencies

Regional constituencies

Former regional constituencies

Full lists

Proposed pan-European constituency 
On May 3, 2022, the European Parliament passed a bill to reform current law regarding elections to the European Parliament. Among the proposed reforms is the creation of a 28-member pan-Union constituency elected by party-list proportional representation on a list separate from elections for regional constituencies. The bill was passed 323 votes to 262, and awaits amendment by the European Council.

See also
Member of the European Parliament
Constituency
Apportionment in the European Parliament

References

External links

Fact Sheets on the European Union
European Parliament election, 2004 (Belgium) – electoral law
European Parliament election, 2004 (Finland) – electoral law
European Parliament election, 2004 (France) – electoral law
European Parliament election, 2004 (Ireland) – electoral law
European Parliament election, 2004 (Poland) – electoral law
European Parliament election, 2004 (United Kingdom) – electoral law

European Parliament
 
Constituencies